1954 in Korea may refer to:
1954 in North Korea
1954 in South Korea